Nick Watt may refer to:

 Nick Watt (CNN reporter)
 Nicholas Watt, British journalist